The 1977 Baltimore International was a men's tennis tournament played on indoor carpet courts at the Towson State College in Baltimore, Maryland in the United States that was part of the 1977 Grand Prix circuit. It was the sixth edition of the event and was held from January 17 through January 23, 1977. Second-seeded Brian Gottfried won the singles title, his second at the event after 1975, and won $20,000 first-prize money.

Finals

Singles
 Brian Gottfried defeated  Guillermo Vilas 6–3, 7–6
 It was Gottfried' 1st singles title of the year and the 8th of his career.

Doubles
 Ion Ţiriac /  Guillermo Vilas defeated  Ross Case /  Jan Kodeš 6–3, 6–7, 6–4

References

External links
 ITF tournament edition details

Baltimore International
Baltimore International
Baltimore International
Baltimore International